Eng Bee Tin Chinese Deli is a Chinese deli chain based in Binondo, Manila, Philippines.

History
Eng Bee Tin was established in 1912 on Ongpin Street in Binondo, Manila by Chua Chiu Hong, a migrant from mainland China whose family decided to reside in the Philippines. The business started as a small stall.

In the 1970s, many stores selling Chinese delicacies competed with Eng Bee Tin and investors were reluctant to support the deli chain. Thus, Eng Bee Tin experienced financial difficulties and almost reached bankruptcy.

Chua Chiu Hong's grandson, Gerry Chua resolved the business' financial difficulties when he took over the family business in 1987 and introduced a hopia made from ube or purple yam. He also developed a grinding process of making hopia from the root crop as well as a technique to make the food product creamier.

The hopia variant was created after Gerry Chua asked a saleslady of a supermarket about their bestselling ice cream flavor and the woman replied that it was ube. He went to Pampanga to learn how to work with halayang ube and developed the ube-flavored hopia.

He attempted to introduce the ube hopia abroad but initial reception was poor. However, Eng Bee Tin eventually received orders from abroad.

Locally, ube hopia was well received when Eng Bee Tin introduced it. According to the Chua family, the business of Eng Bee Tin significantly improved when the store's product, hopiang ube was featured in an episode of the television show, "Citiline" by Cory Quirino. After the television feature, the store originally named Eng Bee Tin Hopia Factory was renamed to its current name as it began to sell other products beside hopia.

Products
The main product of Eng Bee Tin is the hopia ube. In 2013, it was reported that the hopia remains to be the product sold the most which has 22 variants. The store also sells mooncakes and tikoy.

In 2012, the most sold variants are the hopia ube and hopia mongo with the latter filled with mung beans. Both variants in the same year reportedly sells 4,000 to 5,000 packs a day while the rest of the variants sells 3,000 packs a day. The chain sells tikoy, a food product customarily consumed during Lunar New Year, all year-round. The chain also sells sugar-free version of the product.

References

Food and drink companies established in 1912
Food and drink companies of the Philippines
Companies based in Manila
Retail companies established in 1912
Philippine companies established in 1912